The Big Art Project (also known as Big Art) is a UK-wide public art initiative funded by the Channel 4 and Arts Council England. The four-part TV series was made by Carbon Media and first broadcast on Sunday 10 May 2009 on Channel 4. The project also comprises a website centred on The Big Art Mob - designed to create the first comprehensive map of public art across the UK using photographs from people's mobile phones - and significant public art works such as Jaume Plensa's Dream (sculpture) in St Helens, Merseyside. The TV series was narrated by Bill Nighy.

The project was recognised with awards and nominations including an RTS Innovation Award in 2007, the Media Guardian Innovation Award for community engagement in 2008, three nominations for the TV BAFTAs 2008, and a Civic Trust Award 2010

References

External links 
 
 The Big Art Mob

2009 British television series debuts
2009 British television series endings
2000s British documentary television series
Channel 4 original programming
2000s British television miniseries
English-language television shows